This is a list of notable health and medical organizations in Pakistan.

Medical and health organisations based in Pakistan